The King Block, also known as the Crossroads Theater, was a historic building located on Memorial Parkway (Burnet Street) in New Brunswick, New Jersey, United States. It was added to the National Register of Historic Places on May 26, 1988.

The Crossroads Theater Company used the building until 1991, when the company moved from King Block to Monument Square. The building was demolished for redevelopment in the early 1990s.

References

National Register of Historic Places in Middlesex County, New Jersey
Italianate architecture in New Jersey
New Brunswick, New Jersey
New Jersey Register of Historic Places